The Lab may refer to:

 The Lab (band), an Australian band from the 1990s
 The Lab (novel), a 2006 novel by Jack Heath
 The Lab (organization), a non-profit art space in San Francisco, California
 The Lab (film), a 2013 documentary about the Israeli military industry
 The Lab (Grand Theft Auto), a fictional radio station from Grand Theft Auto V
 The Lab (video game), a video game featuring a collection of virtual reality experiments set in the Portal video game universe
 The Lab (Jose Corredera & Miguel Lazaro), an electronic music duo from Spain

See also 
 Lab (disambiguation)